Jack Scott (May 12, 1910  – December 30, 2000) was an Irish-born union activist and member of the Communist Party of Canada. He authored numerous books on Canadian labour history and founded the Canada-China Friendship Association. He fought for Canada in World War II and was awarded the Croix de Guerre for gallantry under fire. Scott opposed allowing Canadian trade unions to be controlled by U.S.-based unions. He was expelled from the Communist Party because of his support of China during the Sino-Soviet split. Jack Scott became a founder of the Vancouver-based Progressive Workers Movement.

References

External links

Jack Scott memorial page on Working TV website
Jack Scott's Biography by Bryan D. Palmer

1910 births
2000 deaths
Canadian communists
Canadian trade unionists
Irish emigrants to Canada